Marinika Tepić (born 8 August 1974) is a Serbian politician. She is a vice-president of the Party of Freedom and Justice (Stranka slobode i pravde, SSP) and a prominent figure in the opposition to Aleksandar Vučić.

Tepić was Secretary for Sports and Youth in the government of Vojvodina from 2012 to 2016 and a member of the National Assembly of Serbia from 2016 to 2020. Prior to joining the SSP on its formation in 2019, she was at different times a member of the League of Social Democrats of Vojvodina (Liga socijaldemokrata Vojvodine, LSV) and the New Party (Nova stranka, NOVA). She was re-elected to the national assembly in the 2022 parliamentary election as the list bearer for the United for the Victory of Serbia alliance of opposition parties.

Early life and career
Tepić was born to an ethnic Romanian family in Pančevo, in what was then the Socialist Autonomous Province of Vojvodina in the Socialist Republic of Serbia, Socialist Federal Republic of Yugoslavia. She graduated from the University of Belgrade Faculty of Philology in 1995 in English and Romanian languages and, in the same year, began teaching elementary school English in Pančevo. She was a professional journalist from 1997 to 2009, writing and reporting for Radio 021, Danas, and the Romanian language publication Libertatea, among other outlets. Tepić is also a veteran human rights and minority rights campaigner and has served as the deputy director for the National Council for the Decentralization of the Republic of Serbia.

Politician

Local politics (2008–16)
Tepić was a member of Pančevo's election commission in the 2008 Serbian local elections. She appeared in the lead position on the LSV's electoral list for the Pančevo city assembly in the 2012 local elections and was elected when the list won five mandates. She resigned her seat on 16 July 2012 after being appointed to the provincial executive.

She again led the LSV list for Pančevo in the 2016 local elections and was re-elected when the list won six seats. She resigned her local mandate on 4 July 2016, this time after taking a seat in the national assembly.

Vojvodina government minister (2012–16)
Tepić received the twenty-fourth position on the LSV's electoral list in the 2012 Vojvodina provincial election. (During this period, half of the Vojvodina assembly's 120 seats were determined by proportional representation and the other half by election in single-member constituencies.) The LSV won eight proportional seats, and Tepić was not elected. The party joined a coalition government after the election, however, and Tepić was appointed to the provincial executive as secretary for sports and youth.

In 2013, Tepić oversaw the introduction of the first sex education classes in the province, following a ten-month consultation process. In announcing the program, she said that it had the approval of ninety-five per cent of parents surveyed by the secretariat and was unlikely to face the same opposition as had a similar initiative in neighbouring Croatia. This notwithstanding, some educational material provoked a backlash from socially conservative groups; the Democratic Party of Serbia (Demokratska stranka Srbije, DSS), which held four seats in the assembly, argued that one publication "promoted homosexuality" and that Tepić should resign as secretary. She defended the material and remained in her position.

She received the sixth position on the LSV's list in the 2016 provincial election, which was conducted entirely under proportional representation. The party won nine seats; she was elected but declined her mandate in order to serve in the national assembly, to which she had been elected in the concurrent 2016 Serbian parliamentary election. Both the republic and provincial elections were won by the Serbian Progressive Party (Srpska napredna stranka, SNS) and its allies; a new government was formed in Vojvodina, and Tepić stood down from her cabinet position on 20 June 2016.

Member of the National Assembly (2014; 2016–20) and after

League of Social Democrats of Vojvodina
The LSV contested the 2014 Serbian parliamentary election on the list of former Serbian president Boris Tadić. Tepić received the sixth position on the list and was elected when it won eighteenth mandates. She resigned her seat shortly thereafter, however, in order to continue serving on the provincial executive.

In the 2016 parliamentary election, Tepić received the eleventh position on a coalition list including the LSV and was re-elected when the list won thirteen mandates. The Progressive Party and its allies won the election, and Tepić served in opposition; this notwithstanding, she was appointed as head of the assembly's committee on European integration. She was also a deputy member of the committee on human and minority rights and gender equality, the committee on the rights of the child, and the committee on administrative, budgetary, mandate, and immunity issues; a substitute member of Serbia's delegation to the parliamentary dimension of the Central European Initiative; and a member of the parliamentary friendship groups with Germany, Italy, and The Netherlands.

Tepić resigned from the LSV in January 2017, in protest against party leader Nenad Čanak's decision to contest the 2017 Serbian presidential election rather than supporting the candidacy of Saša Janković. She served on Janković's political committee during the campaign. Janković ultimately finished second against Aleksandar Vučić. In April 2017, having lost her party affiliation, Tepić was removed from her committee assignments in the national assembly at the LSV's discretion.

New Party

Tepić joined the New Party in April 2017, becoming its second member in the assembly after party leader Zoran Živković. She was appointed to the party's presidency and was named as its provincial leader in Vojvodina. The following month, Živković and Tepić joined with three former members of the Enough Is Enough (Dosta je bilo, DJB) association to start a parliamentary group called the Independent MPs Club.

Tepić, a vocal opponent of fascism, was harassed by anonymous graffiti messages from extreme right-wing groups in 2017; one such message read, "Corneliu Codreanu, not Marinika Čobanu." The New Party condemned these messages and argued that they were being condoned by Serbia's government and state organs. In the same period, Tepić reported receiving death threats from right-wing groups, and Živković urged the government to assess whether she required protection.<ref>"Grafiti sa pretnjama Mariniki Tepić", '"Danas, 13 December 2017, accessed 5 July 2018.</ref> Meho Omerović, the chair of the assembly's committee on human and minority rights, condemned the threats against her and urged the police to ensure her safety.

The New Party contested the March 2018 Belgrade City Assembly election in a coalition with the Democratic Party (Demokratska stranka, DS) and the Social Democratic Party (Socijaldemokratska stranka, SDS); their combined list did not cross the electoral threshold. Tepić resigned her leadership positions in the party the following month, saying that it had failed to respond properly to its defeat. Some media sources reported that she had resigned from the party, but she clarified that she was still a member and, moreover, was not calling for Živković's resignation. By September of the same year, however, she was no longer actively involved with the party.

Party of Freedom and Justice
On 19 April 2019, Tepić was selected as a vice-president of the newly formed Party of Freedom and Justice (SSP). Like several other opposition parties, the SSP began a policy of non-participation with state institutions, including the national assembly, in 2019 and ultimately boycotted the 2020 parliamentary election.

Since joining the SSP, Tepić has emerged as one of the most prominent critics of Aleksandar Vučić's presidency and Serbia's SNS-led administration. She has accused the regime of involvement with organized crime groups, charging that the government created the notorious Belivuk clan before later turning against it. In April 2021, she accused Dragan Marković, the leader of the United Serbia (Jedinstvena Srbija, JS) party and an ally of the administration, of organizing the prostitution of women and girls, some underage, at a prominent nightclub in his home community of Jagodina. She also accused the regime of shielding Marković from prosecution. (An investigation was launched shortly after Tepić first made her charges. Marković responded that the accusations against him were "lies" and brought a lawsuit against Tepić in early 2022. The matter remains unresolved.)"Dragan Marković Palma tužio Mariniku Tepić", N1, 11 February 2022, accessed 14 June 2022.

Serbia's opposition parties ended their boycott of the electoral process in 2022. Tepić appeared in the lead position on the United for the Victory of Serbia list in the 2022 parliamentary election and was elected to a third term when the list won thirty-eight seats. The SNS and its allies once again won the election, and the SSP serves in opposition. In late May 2022, it was announced that Tepić would lead an assembly group comprising the SSP, the Movement of Free Citizens (Pokret slobodnih građana, PSG), the Movement for Reversal (Pokret za preokret'', PZP), the "Sloga" Trade Union, and some independent members. She is now a member of the security services control committee, a deputy member of the defence and internal affairs committee, and the chair of Serbia's delegation to the European Union–Serbia stabilization and association committee.

On 1 June 2022, Tepić voiced her support for sanctioning Russia due to the Russian invasion of Ukraine.

References

1974 births
Living people
Politicians from Pančevo
21st-century Serbian women politicians
21st-century Serbian politicians
Serbian people of Romanian descent
Romanians of Vojvodina
Government ministers of Vojvodina
Members of the National Assembly (Serbia)
Substitute members of the Parliamentary Dimension of the Central European Initiative
League of Social Democrats of Vojvodina politicians
New Party (Serbia) politicians
Party of Freedom and Justice politicians
Women members of the National Assembly (Serbia)